Çaylıca can refer to:

 Çaylıca, İnegöl
 Çaylıca, Kurşunlu